Cyril Baselios, Moran Mor Cyril Baselios Maphrian (1935–2007), was the first Major Archbishop of the Syro-Malankara Catholic Church.

Cyril Baselios may also refer to:

Cyril Mar Baselios I, the Metropolitan of the Malabar Independent Syrian Church also known as Thozhyur Sabha (Thozhyur Church) or Anjoor Church (2001-present)